Judith Christie McAllister (born September 29, 1963 as Judith F. Christie) is an American Pentecostal gospel musician, the leader of Never Ending Worship, and she was the President of the International Music Department for the Church of God in Christ from 2009 until 2021. Her first album, Send Judah First, was released by Judah Music Records in 2000. She released, Raise the Praise, with Judah Music Records in 2003. The third album, In His Presence: Live!, was released in 2006, and this was a Billboard magazine breakthrough release upon the Gospel Albums and two others. Her fourth album, Sound the Trumpet, was released in 2011 with Shanachie Records, and this charted upon the aforementioned chart.

Early life
She was born in Harlem, on September 29, 1963, as Judith F. Christie, as the daughter of a minister from Jamaica and her mother, who is from Barbados. Her mother being a pianist at her father's church growing up gave her the impetus to learn how to play the piano and become a pianist in her own right. She went to Oral Roberts University in the mid-1980s.

Music career
In 1992, she became the Music Director at West Angeles Church of God in Christ (COGIC). In 2004, she became a vice-president for the International Music Department (COGIC) under the leadership of Iris Stevenson. Finally in 2009, she was appointed the President of the International Music Department (COGIC) by Presiding Bishop Charles E. Blake Sr.  Her music recording career commenced in 2001, with her album, Send Judah First, and it was released by her label Judah Records on January 30, 2001. She released, Raise the Praise, on January 27, 2003 again by her label Judah Records. The third album, In His Presence: Live!, was released on May 30, 2006 by Artemis Records, and this was her breakthrough release upon the Billboard magazine Gospel Albums chart at No. 10, while placing on two more charts. The subsequent album, Sound the Trumpet, released by Shanachie Records in 2011, and this charted at No. 13 on the aforementioned chart.

Personal life
She is married to Darin McAllister, and together they reside in Los Angeles, California with their children. She serves as the Minister of Music under the presiding bishop of the Church of God in Christ, Charles E. Blake, church West Angeles.

Discography

References

External links
 Official website
 Cross Rhythms artist profile

1963 births
Living people
African-American women singer-songwriters
African-American Christians
Musicians from New York City
Singer-songwriters from New York (state)
American people of Jamaican descent
American people of Barbadian descent
Oral Roberts University alumni
21st-century African-American women singers